Madjoari Reserve is a complete reserve in Burkina Faso. 
Established in 1970 it is located in Tapoa Province and covers an area of 170 km.

Protected areas of Burkina Faso
Tapoa Province
Protected areas established in 1970